Topps Comics was a division of Topps Company, Inc. that published comic books from 1993 to 1998, beginning its existence during a short comics-industry boom that attracted many investors and new companies. It was based in New York City, at 254 36th Street, Brooklyn, and at One Whitehall Street, in Manhattan.

The company specialized in licensed titles, particularly movie and television series tie-ins, such The X-Files, based on the Fox TV show, and the films Bram Stoker's Dracula and Jurassic Park. It also licensed such literary properties as Zorro, and published a smattering of original series, including Cadillacs and Dinosaurs and several based on concepts by then-retired industry legend Jack Kirby.

History
In March 1992, Topps Company, Inc. announced the formation of Topps Comics, to be headed by Jim Salicrup, with plans to start publishing in October 1992.

In April 1993, Topps launched a superhero line, "The Kirbyverse", based on Jack Kirby drawings and concepts, with four one-shot titles.

Topps entered the comic book market as the number of publishers was increasing, with at least nine other companies joining the field from 1990 to 1992. This coincided with an increase in comic-book market-speculation that created inflated sales and an eventual collapse of the market. Topps Comics closed in 1998.

Personnel
The editor-in-chief and associate publisher was Jim Salicrup. Editors included Len Brown (co-creator of Topps' 1962 Mars Attacks cards), Howard Zimmerman, and Dwight Jon Zimmerman. The company's sales and promotions manager Charles S. Novinskie is listed as, additionally, a Topps Comics editor in his capsule biography at Non-Sport Update magazine. The company's design director, Brian Boerner, is listed as Reprint Editor (along with Charles S. Novinskie) in the Xena trade paperbacks' credits.

Veteran comic-book scripter Tony Isabella, writing about difficulties with The X-Files creator Chris Carter over the Topps Comics' series, said in a 2000 interview:

The Kirbyverse

The "Kirbyverse" comics, launched simultaneously with April 1993 cover-dates, stemmed from character designs and story concepts that the prolific Kirby, at this very late point in his life, had in his files of unrealized projects and preliminary sketches (some for Pacific Comics, which went defunct in the 1980s). Topps licensed them for an eight-title, interrelated mythos based around what became Jack Kirby's Secret City Saga. That flagship title was written by former Marvel Comics editor-in-chief Roy Thomas, with an issue #0 prequel drawn by artist Walt Simonson and the remainder of the series by Spider-Man co-creator Steve Ditko.

Kirby himself wrote and drew eight pages of the Satan's Six premiere, interlaced with story pages by writer Tony Isabella, penciler John Cleary and inker Armando Gil. Kirby's contribution may have been drawn in the 1970s, as one historian wrote: "The 1970s was the flowering of Jack's interest in the paranormal. Freed from the restraints of more conservative collaborators, Jack delved into these themes with gusto. ... [He] developed 'Satan's Six' around this time, although it didn't see the light of day until the Topps Kirbyverse campaign in the 1990s". As well, the covers of the Bombast, Captain Glory, and NightGlider one-shot comics noted below were built around preexisting Kirby character designs.

Along with Secret City Saga and Satan's Six, the Kirbyverse titles were:
Bombast, by plotter Thomas, scripter Gary Friedrich and artists Dick Ayers & John Severin
Captain Glory, by writer Thomas and artist Ditko
Jack Kirby's TeenAgents, by writer Kurt Busiek, penciler Neil Vokes, and inkers John Beatty and Jordi Ensign
Jack Kirby's Silver Star, by writer Busiek, penciler James W. Fry III, and inker Terry Austin
NightGlider, by plotter Thomas, scripter Gerry Conway, and artist Don Heck
Victory, by writer Busiek, penciler Keith Giffen, and inker Jimmy Palmiotti

Kurt Busiek, in an undated interview, gave some background on the comics line:

In 2000, the Kirby estate said Dark Horse Entertainment had optioned Satan's Six as a film property.

In 2011, Dynamite Entertainment published a comic book series titled Kirby: Genesis that represented a reboot of the Kirbyverse.

List of Topps Comics

Note: Most, but not all, were designed as limited series.

Original series
The Barbi Twins Adventures #1 (July 1995)
Cadillacs and Dinosaurs #1–9 (February—November 1994)
Lady Rawhide (volume 1), #1—5 (July 1995—March 1996, original spin-off of Zorro)
Lady Rawhide (volume 2) #1—5 (miniseries; October 1996—June 1997, preview ashcan comic inserted in Wizard magazine)

Kirbyverse comics
Bombast #1 (April 1993, one-shot)
Captain Glory #1 (April 1993, one-shot)
Jack Kirby's Secret City Saga #0—4 (April—August 1993)
Jack Kirby's Silver Star #1 (October 1993, planned four-issue miniseries truncated)
Jack Kirby's TeenAgents #1—4 (August—November 1993)
Night Glider #1 (April 1993, one-shot)
Satan's Six #1—4 (April—July 1993)
Satan's Six: Hellspawn #1—3 (June—July 1994)
Victory #1 (June 1994; planned five-issue miniseries, truncated)

Literary adaptations/tie-ins
Bill, the Galactic Hero #1—3 (July—November 1994)
The Dracula Chronicles #1—3 (April 1995, reprint of the series Dracula: Vlad the Impaler)
Dracula Versus Zorro #1—2 (October—November 1993)
Dracula: Vlad the Impaler #1—3 (February—April 1993)
Elric: One Life #0 (August 1996)
Elric: Stormbringer #1—7 (1997, co-published with Dark Horse Comics)
The Frankenstein/Dracula War #1—3 (February—April 1995)
Ray Bradbury Comics #1—5 (April—October 1993)
A Ray Bradbury Comics Special — Ray Bradbury's The Illustrated Man #1 (1993)
A Ray Bradbury Comics Special — Ray Bradbury's Martian Chronicles #1 (June 1994)
A Ray Bradbury Comics Special — Ray Bradbury's Tales of Terror #1 (May 1994)Zorro #0–11 (November 1993—November 1994)

Movie adaptations/tie-insBram Stoker's Dracula #1—4 (October 1992—January 1993)Dragonheart #1—2 (May—June 1996) Jackie Chan's Spartan X: The Armour of Heaven #1—3 (May—August 1997)James Bond 007: GoldenEye #00 + #1 (January 1996)Jason Goes to Hell: The Final Friday #1—3 (July—September 1993)Jason vs. Leatherface #1—3 (October 1995—January 1996)Jurassic Park #1—4 (June—August 1993) + #0 (November 1993)Jurassic Park: Raptor #1—2 (November—December 1993)Jurassic Park: Raptors Attack #1—4 (March—June 1994)Jurassic Park: Raptors Hijack #1—4 (July—October 1994)Jurassic Park Adventures #1—10 (June 1994—February 1995)Jurassic Park Annual #1 (May 1995)Mary Shelley's Frankenstein #1—4 (October 1994—January 1995)Return to Jurassic Park #1—9 (April 1995—February 1996)Star Wars: Tales of the Jedi: Dark Lords of the Sith — Special Ashcan Edition (September 1994, co-published with Dark Horse Comics)The Lost World: Jurassic Park #1—4 (May—August 1997)

TV/radio adaptations/tie-insDuckman #1—5 (November 1994—May 1995) + #0 (February 1996)Duckman: The Mob Frog Saga #1—3 (November 1994—February 1995)Exosquad #0—1 (January 1994)Hercules: The Legendary Journeys #1—5 (June—October 1996)The Lone Ranger and Tonto #1—4 (August—November 1994)The Marriage of Hercules and Xena #1 (July 1998)Space: Above and Beyond #1—3 (January—March 1996)Space: Above and Beyond — The Gauntlet #1—2 (May—June 1996)The X-Files #1—41 (Jan. 1995 – Sept. 1998) + #0 (an adaptation of the series' pilot episode)The X-Files Annual #1—2 (August 1995; 1996)The X-Files Comics Digest #1—3 (December 1995—September 1996)The X-Files: Fight the Future #1 (July 1998, an adaptation of the spin-off feature film)The X-Files: Ground Zero #1—4 (December 1997—March 1998, an adaptation of the spin-off novel by Kevin J. Anderson)Xena: Warrior Princess #1—2 (August—September 1997) + #0 (October 1997)Xena: Warrior Princess: Blood Lines #1—2 (May—June 1998)Xena: Warrior Princess: The Dragon's Teeth #1—3 (December 1997—February 1998)Xena: Warrior Princess: The Orpheus Trilogy #1—3 (March—May 1998)Xena: Warrior Princess: The Wrath of Hera #1—2 (September—October 1998)Xena: Warrior Princess: Year One #1 (August 1997)Xena: Warrior Princess and the Original Olympics #1—3 (June—August 1998)Xena: Warrior Princess vs. Callisto #1—3 (February—March 1998)Xena: Warrior Princess/Joxer: Warrior Prince #1—3 (November 1997—January 1998)

Trading-card adaptations/tie-insMars Attacks (volume 1) #1—5 (May—October 1994, limited series)Mars Attacks (volume 2) #1—7 (August 1995—May 1996, ongoing series)Mars Attacks #1/2 (1995, co-published with Wizard magazine)Mars Attacks: Wizard Ace Edition #65 (1996, co-published with Wizard magazine)Mars Attacks Baseball Special #1 (June 1996)Mars Attacks High School #1—2 (May—September 1997)Mars Attacks Image #1—4 (December 1996—April 1997)Mars Attacks the Savage Dragon #1—4 (December 1996—March 1997)

OtherTopps Comics Presents #0 (1993)Topps Comics Preview'' #1 (March 1994)

References

External links
"Jack Kirby: A By-the-Month Chronology: 1980–1995". MarvelMastworks.com, n.d. WebCitation archive.

 
Defunct book publishing companies of the United States
Publishing companies established in 1993
Companies disestablished in 1998
Defunct comics and manga publishing companies